Kalaj Khuseh (also Romanized as Kalāj Khūseh; also known as Kalāj Khāseh) is a village in Garmab Rural District, Chahardangeh District, Sari County, Mazandaran Province, Iran. At the 2006 census, its population was 19, in 5 families.

References 

Populated places in Sari County